Yūzō, Yuzo or Yuuzou is a masculine Japanese given name.

Possible writings
Yūzō can be written using different combinations of kanji characters. Here are some examples: 

勇三, "courage, 3"
悠三, "calm, 3"
雄三, "male, 3"
優三, "gentleness, 3"
祐三, "to help, 3"
佑三, "to help, 3"
勇蔵, "courage, store up"
悠蔵, "calm, store up"
雄蔵, "male, store up"
裕蔵, "rich, store up"
優蔵, "gentleness, store up"
祐蔵, "to help, store up"
佑蔵, "to help, store up"
勇造, "courage, create"
悠造, "calm, create"
雄造, "male, create"
優造, "gentleness, create"
祐造, "to help, create"
佑造, "to help, create"

The name can also be written in hiragana ゆうぞう or katakana ユウゾウ.

Notable people with the name

, Japanese footballer
, Japanese politician
, Japanese footballer
, Japanese sprinter
, Japanese film director
, Japanese singer and actor
, Japanese footballer
, Japanese musician and video game composer
, Japanese footballer
, Japanese general
, Japanese footballer
, Japanese volleyball player
, Japanese Go player
, Japanese painter
, Japanese manga artist
, Japanese speed skater
, Japanese footballer
, Japanese footballer
, Japanese composer and conductor
, Japanese footballer
, Japanese writer and playwright

Fictional characters 

 , a character from A3!

Japanese masculine given names